Mark Todd Rodenhauser (born June 1, 1961) is a former American football center who played 13 seasons in the National Football League with seven different teams. He played college football at Illinois State University.  He was selected by the Carolina Panthers in the 1995 NFL Expansion Draft. Rodenhauser started his football career with the Chicago Bruisers of the Arena Football League. He also made an appearance in the popular series Football Follies, in the 21st Century Follies DVDs, where he could snap a football a full length of a basketball court.

1961 births
Living people
American football offensive linemen
American football long snappers
Illinois State Redbirds football players
Chicago Bears players
Minnesota Vikings players
San Diego Chargers players
Detroit Lions players
Carolina Panthers players
Chicago Bruisers players
People from Addison, Illinois
National Football League replacement players
Pittsburgh Steelers players